The 1910 Vanderbilt vs Yale football game, played October 22, 1910, was a college football game between the Vanderbilt Commodores and Yale Bulldogs. Vanderbilt managed to hold defending national champion Yale to a scoreless tie on its home field, the south's first great showing against an Eastern power. It was the first home game in which Yale failed to score a point.

Game summary
"Four times brilliant rushes around end by Capt. Neely brought the ball well into Yale territory, only to be lost because of penalties against the visitors. Vanderbilt did not substitute a single player."

Aftermath
Vanderbilt captain Bill Neely, brother of Jess Neely, recalled the event: "The score tells the story a good deal better than I can. All I want to say is that I never saw a football team fight any harder at every point that Vanderbilt fought today – line, ends, and backfield. We went in to give Yale the best we had and I think we about did it." In Nashville on the night of the game, over a thousand Vanderbilt students (boys) "clad in nightshirts, pajamas and curtailed bonnets," celebrated with a parade march through the streets, and after a trip to the woman's college, with a bonfire at Dudley Field well into the night.

Grantland Rice wrote:

References

1910 college football season
vs. Yale 1910
vs. Vanderbilt 1910
October 1910 sports events
1910 in sports in Connecticut